NADH dehydrogenase is an enzyme that converts nicotinamide adenine dinucleotide (NAD) from its reduced form (NADH) to its oxidized form (NAD+). Members of the NADH dehydrogenase family and analogues are commonly systematically named using the format NADH:acceptor oxidoreductase. The chemical reaction these enzymes catalyze are generally represented with the follow equation;

 NADH + H+ + acceptor  NAD+ + reduced acceptor

NADH dehydrogenase is a flavoprotein that contains iron-sulfur centers.

NADH dehydrogenase is used in the electron transport chain for generation of ATP.

The EC term NADH dehydrogenase (quinone) (EC 1.6.5.11) is defined for NADH dehydrogenases that use a quinone (excluding ubiquinone) as the acceptor. The EC term NADH dehydrogenase (ubiquinone) (EC 7.1.1.2) is defined for those with ubiquinone as the acceptor.

References

External links 
 

EC 1.6.99

sr:NADH dehidrogenaza